Hypenodes fractilinea, the broken-line hypenodes, is a moth in the family Erebidae. The species was described by John B. Smith in 1908. It is found from Nova Scotia south to North Carolina, west across Canada to Alberta. The habitat consists of mixed wood and deciduous woodland.

They are on wing from late June to mid-August.

References

Moths described in 1908
Hypenodinae
Moths of North America